Rubén Plaza Molina (born 29 February 1980) is a Spanish former professional road bicycle racer, who competed professionally between 2001 and 2019 for the , S.L. Benfica,  (over three spells),  and  teams. During his career, he recorded a top 5 overall placing in the 2005 Vuelta a España, and won three Grand Tour stages.

Career
Plaza was born in Ibi, Spain. In 2006 he was implicated in the Operación Puerto doping scandal, but was later acquitted of any involvement. Nevertheless, after an abridged 2007 season with  he spent 2008 and 2009 with smaller Continental level teams in Portugal. Despite this, in 2009 he was able to take his second victory in the Spanish national championships, before finishing 4th overall in the Volta a Portugal, a result which was later upgraded to 3rd by the disqualification of his Liberty Seguros teammate Nuno Ribeiro for a doping violation. The simultaneous positive tests of two of the team's other riders caused the team to disband, leaving Plaza without a ride for 2010.

In 2015, he won Stage 16 of the Tour de France, his second Grand Tour stage win.

In 2015, he also won Stage 20 of the Vuelta a España. He was named in the start list for the 2016 Giro d'Italia.

Career achievements

Major results

1997
 National Junior Road Championships
1st  Road race
3rd Time trial
1998
 1st  Time trial, National Junior Road Championships
2003
 1st  Road race, National Road Championships
 1st Stage 5 Regio-Tour
2004
 1st Stage 5 (ITT) Trofeú Joaquim Agostinho
 3rd Trofeo Cala Millor
 4th Overall Vuelta a Murcia
 6th Overall Volta a la Comunitat Valenciana
 10th Circuito de Getxo
2005
 1st  Overall GP Costa Azul
1st Mountains classification
1st Stage 2
 1st  Overall Vuelta a Aragón
1st Stage 4 (ITT)
 1st Stage 2 Vuelta a Murcia
 3rd Time trial, National Road Championships
 4th Time trial, UCI Road World Championships
 5th Overall Vuelta a España
1st Stage 20 (ITT)
 5th Klasika Primavera
 6th Overall Critérium International
2006
 1st Clásica a los Puertos de Guadarrama
 2nd Overall Vuelta a La Rioja
 2nd Time trial, National Road Championships
 4th Overall Vuelta a Asturias
1st Stage 5
 4th Overall Trofeú Joaquim Agostinho
1st Stage 1
 9th Subida a Urkiola
2007
 1st Overall Vuelta a La Rioja
 4th Overall Clásica Internacional de Alcobendas
 5th Overall Euskal Bizikleta
 10th Overall Vuelta a Burgos
2008
 1st  Overall Volta a la Comunitat Valenciana
 1st Stage 1 (ITT) Vuelta a la Comunidad de Madrid
 2nd Time trial, National Road Championships
 3rd Overall Volta a Portugal
1st Prologue
 9th Overall Volta ao Algarve
2009
 National Road Championships
1st  Road race
3rd Time trial
 1st Stage 2 GP CTT Correios de Portugal
 2nd Overall Vuelta a Murcia
1st Stage 4
 3rd Overall Volta ao Algarve
 3rd Overall Volta a Portugal
1st Stage 6
 4th Overall Circuit de Lorraine
1st Stage 3
2010
 3rd Time trial, National Road Championships
 10th Overall Tour de France
2012
 10th Overall Circuit de la Sarthe
2013
 1st  Overall Vuelta a Castilla y León
1st Stage 3
 3rd Time trial, National Road Championships
 4th Vuelta a la Comunidad de Madrid
 6th Overall Route du Sud
 9th Overall Vuelta a Asturias
2015
 1st Stage 16 Tour de France
Vuelta a España
1st Stage 20
 Combativity award Stage 20
2018
 1st  Overall Vuelta a Castilla y León
1st Stage 3
 9th Prueba Villafranca de Ordizia
2019
 6th Overall Tour of Antalya
 10th GP Miguel Induráin

Grand Tour general classification results timeline

Notes

References

External links

 
 
 

1980 births
Living people
People from Alcoià
Sportspeople from the Province of Alicante
Spanish male cyclists
Spanish Vuelta a España stage winners
Cyclists from the Valencian Community
Spanish Tour de France stage winners
S.L. Benfica (cycling)